Canada's Young New Democrats, officially the New Democratic Youth of Canada, are the youth wing of the New Democratic Party of Canada. Any party member, aged 25 or under is automatically a member of the CYND and is eligible to attend and vote in the youth wing's convention. The current co-chair of the organization Kirat Singh, was elected during the 2021 Federal New Democratic Party (NDP) Convention, along with the rest of its executive.

The CYND is autonomous of the main party. It sends its own delegates to the federal convention and council.

Traditionally, members of the CYND have tended to be more ideologically driven than the rest of the party. Since Jack Layton took over the helm of the party in 2003, the youth base has grown and now incorporates a wider base of progressive youth.

It typically elects its executives for two year terms at its own convention, usually held the day before the NDP holds its conventions.

Reaction to 2015 election loss and push for party renewal 
In the lead up to the 2015 election, the CYND had been openly critical of leader Thomas Mulcair when he broke with long standing NDP principles, in particular on matters of foreign policy. After the stunning 2015 election that saw Thomas Mulcair lose official opposition status, the party was heading into a leadership review at 2016 convention in Edmonton. 

One month before the leadership review CYND members from two Montreal Universities published an open letter in Le Devoir calling on Thomas Mulcair to resign.  

Pressure continued to mount on Mulcair when it was reported that NDP McGill had submitted a resolution to CYND convention that would urge all CYND member delegates to vote for a leadership race. 

On the eve of the Edmonton convention, the CYND published an open letter urging members to vote for party renewal, becoming the first official section of the NDP to call for members to "support a new direction, and a new style of leadership." Many members of the CYND spoke out about the need for party renewal throughout convention, organizing votes to trigger a leadership election.

A few days later, the membership of the NDP followed the lead of the CYND with a majority of the delegates to the Edmonton Convention voting for a new leadership race. This was the first time in Canadian history that a leader of a political party had lost a leadership review.

The process started at the 2016 Edmonton Convention culminated for a new leadership in the election of Ontario NDP MPP Jagmeet Singh on October 1, 2017, after he won on first ballot with 53.8 per cent of the vote.

References

External links
 British Columbia Young New Democrats
 New Democratic Youth of Alberta
 Manitoba Young New Democrats
 Ontario New Democratic Youth 
 New Brunswick Young New Democrats
 Jeunes néo-démocrates du Québec

New Democratic Party (Canada)
New Democrats
Youth wings of social democratic parties